Nigel Irens RDI is a leading yacht designer. Amongst his designs are the Adventurer, a 35m trimaran motor yacht which completed a record-breaking circumnavigation in 1998, and B&Q/Castorama  a 23 m sailing trimaran used by Ellen MacArthur to break the world record for solo circumnavigation in 2005.

His design portfolio is wide-ranging, from record-breaking yachts to innovative cruising designs such as Roxane, and other sailing designs of traditional appearance such as the Westernman cutters – designed in association with the late Ed Burnett – or the launch Rangeboat, a 12m power craft also of traditional appearance. Typically, Irens' designs synthesise traditional forms with modern materials and methods of construction, with Carbon fibre masts, laminated frames, and epoxied strip wood strongly in evidence.

For a while, when beginning his career as a yacht designer, Ed Burnett worked for Irens, and that led to a number of successful collaborations. They worked together on designs such as Zinnia, a 30ft gaff cutter, Kilrush Nomad II, a 43ft gaff cutter, and the King Alfred dinghy to be built by King Alfred School in London. By 2012, the school had built three, and use them to introduce students to dinghy cruising.

Irens is perhaps particularly noteworthy for the simplicity, efficiency, and essential elegance of his design.

References

External links
Official site

British yacht designers
Living people
Year of birth missing (living people)
Multihull designers